Jaime Mendoza-Nava (December 1, 1925 – May 31, 2005) was a Bolivian-American composer and conductor.

Early life and work

Mendoza-Nava was born in La Paz, Bolivia. He studied at The Juilliard School and Madrid Royal Conservatory, the Sorbonne, and with Nadia Boulanger.  He won the Madrid Conservatory's First Prize in 1950, completing the five-year program in a year's time.  Eventually, he was on the staff of Walt Disney Studios and his works were recorded by MGM Records.

Much of his music is inspired by the pentatonic music of the Andes.

In Hollywood, he also had several credits as a sound editor.

He died in Los Angeles, California, on May 31, 2005.

Mendoza-Nava's grandson, Nic Mendoza (born April 4, 1989), is a music and multimedia producer. Nic is the founder of his production entity, Uprise LLC, and co-founder of a production company and record imprint, Encore Endeavor One (EE1). Nic is the Producer of Up, Up & Away! a musical fable, starring Marilyn McCoo, Billy Davis, Jr. and The Next Dimension, and continues to work with the duo on their forthcoming project with BMG.

Selected filmography

Five Minutes to Love (1963)
Orgy of the Dead (1965)
The Black Klansman (1966)
The Hostage (1967)
Fever Heat (1968)
The Stewardesses (1969)
The Wild Scene (1970)
Brother, Cry for Me (1970)
Dream No Evil (1970)
The Brotherhood of Satan (1971)
Blood Legacy (1971)
The Female Bunch (1971)
The Legend of Boggy Creek (1972)
Grave of the Vampire (1972)
House of Terror (1973)
Bootleggers (1974)
Smoke in the Wind (1975)
Aloha, Bobby and Rose (1975)
Psycho From Texas (1975)
 The Winds of Autumn (1976)
Creature from Black Lake (1976)
The Town That Dreaded Sundown (1976)
The Shadow of Chikara (1977)
Grayeagle (1977)
The Boys in Company C (1978)
Vampire Hookers (1978)
The Norseman (1978)
The Evictors (1979)
The Legend of Alfred Packer (1980)
Mausoleum (1983)

Works

Tres Danzas Bolivianas for piano
Concerto for Piano and Orchestra
 "La niña que toca el arpa" (piano and soprano singer)
Don Alvaro (symphonic poem)
Gitana for piano
Antawara (symphonic poem)
Pachamama (symphonic poem)
Estampas y Estampillas for Orchestra of 'Cellos
Western Overture for orchestra, opening music for CBS Apollo 11 coverage

References

Edward Cole, liner notes for Estamapa y Estampillas for Orchestra of 'Cellos, MGM Records, no date given.

External links
Jaime Mendoza-Nava on IMDb

1925 births
2005 deaths
Juilliard School alumni
University of Paris alumni
Madrid Royal Conservatory alumni
Bolivian composers
Bolivian male musicians
Male film score composers
Male composers
Bolivian emigrants to the United States
People from La Paz
20th-century male musicians